The 1998 United States Senate election in Wisconsin was held November 3, 1998. Incumbent Democratic U.S. Senator Russ Feingold won re-election to a second term.

Major candidates

Democratic 
 Russ Feingold, incumbent U.S. Senator

Republican 
 Mark Neumann, U.S. Representative

Campaign 
In September 1997, Neumann announced his candidacy for the United States Senate against Russ Feingold. Both candidates had similar views on the budget surplus, although Neumann was for banning partial-birth abortion while Feingold was against a ban. Both candidates limited themselves to $3.8 million in campaign spending ($1 for every citizen of Wisconsin), although outside groups spent more than $2 million on Neumann; Feingold refused to have outside groups spend their own 'soft money' on his behalf. Feingold defeated Neumann by a slim 2% margin in the election. According to the Milwaukee Journal-Sentinel, Neumann had a 30,000 vote margin outside Milwaukee County, but was overwhelmed by a 68,000 vote margin in Milwaukee County.

Results

See also 
 1998 United States Senate elections
 1998 Wisconsin gubernatorial election

References 

United States Senate
Wisconsin
1998